In group theory, Bender's method is a method introduced by  for simplifying the local group theoretic analysis of the odd order theorem. Shortly afterwards he used it to simplify the Walter theorem on groups with abelian Sylow 2-subgroups , and Gorenstein and Walter's classification of groups with dihedral Sylow 2-subgroups. Bender's method involves studying a maximal subgroup M containing the centralizer of an involution, and its generalized Fitting subgroup F*(M).

One succinct version of Bender's method is the result that if M, N are two distinct maximal subgroups of a simple group with F*(M) ≤ N and F*(N) ≤ M, then there is a prime p such that both F*(M) and F*(N) are p-groups. This situation occurs whenever M and N are distinct maximal parabolic subgroups of a simple group of Lie type, and in this case p is the characteristic, but this has only been used to help identify groups of low Lie rank.

References

 
 

Group theory